Black gold is a term used in the Republic of China (Taiwan) to refer to political corruption, underworld politics and political violence. The term refers to the obtaining of money (the "gold") through a dark, secretive, and corrupt method ("black", an adjective in Chinese that also means illegal or illicit).

The Kuomintang (KMT; Chinese Nationalist Party) has frequently been criticized in Taiwan for its connections to gangsters and black gold. The party has had a long association with underground societies, and its founder Sun Yat-sen had joined the Triads to gain support for the Republican Revolution. In its early years, the KMT relied on support from organized crime, gangs, and unions and clan organizations with criminal ties in its efforts to consolidate power in war-torn post-imperial China.  As a result, the party made concessions to local "crime bosses", such as the notorious Du Yuesheng in Shanghai, who were well-connected with its longtime leader, Chiang Kai-shek. During the Shanghai massacre of 1927, the KMT employed the Green Gang to exterminate suspected communists; the Green Gang also happened to be a major financial supporter of Chiang Kai-shek. The KMT's relationships with such organizations are believed to persist. KMT fled to Taiwan following the Chinese Civil War. As Minister of Justice from 1993 to 1996, former Taipei mayor and KMT Party Chairman Ma Ying-jeou is credited with attempts to fight black gold corruption and bring KMT out of corruption, and his removal from office by the KMT was widely attributed to him being too effective at fighting black gold.

The Democratic Progressive Party (DPP) gained considerable support in the 1990s through its reform agenda, even from those opposed to the DPP position on Taiwanese independence.  President Chen Shui-bian, former Taipei mayor, was noted for his attempts to clamp down on black gold throughout his career. However, Chen's presidential administration has been criticized, including by former colleagues and supporters, for exploiting their control of government for personal wealth in, a typical black-gold manner. Former DPP party leader Hsu Hsin-liang has criticized Chen in a public speech for betraying the ideals of the DPP after coming to power. After a series of high-profile corruption scandals, public support for DPP diminished in the 2005 "Three-in-One" election. Campaigning on a "save Taiwan from corruption" platform, the KMT-led pan-blue coalition won 16 of 23 county and town offices and became the majority party at the local level. Chen was charged with corruption after stepping down as president in 2008.

References

External links 
Asiaweek: The Curse of Black Gold
Professor Jerome A. Cohen calls for Taiwan’s legal scholars to speak out on law reforms

Politics of the Republic of China
Politics of China
Triad (organized crime)